Cannabis in Dominica is a Class B drug to cultivate, sell or possess. This means that possession is punishable by 12 months and $12,000 (summary) or 2 years and $20,000 (on indictment). Supplying, production, or importation are punishable by 3 years and $100,000 (summary) or 14 years and $200,000 (on indictment).

In 1995, the US government described Dominica as a minor cannabis producer but "increasingly exploited transit route", with some cannabis cultivated on the island but mostly consumed locally. In 1994 Dominican authorities seized 741 kg of cannabis and eradicated 48,855 plants.

A 2011 report noted that Dominica had large-scale cannabis cultivation for both trafficking and local use, with an estimated 210 acres of cannabis cultivated annually.

On the 26th of October 2020 the Commonwealth of Dominica government passed an amendment to a bill to decriminalize the possession of 28 grams or 1 ounce or less of Cannabis. The amendment also allows the cultivation of 3 cannabis plants at their place of residence.

References

Sources
 https://dominica.gov.dm/images/documents/bills_for_review/Bill_-_Drugs_Prevention_of_Misuse_Amd_Act_2020.pdf  
 https://dominicanewsonline.com/news/homepage/news/general/dominica-parliament-passes-legislation-to-decriminalize-small-amounts-of-marijuana/

Dominica
Drugs in Dominica
Dominica
Dominica